Sami Tlemcani (born 21 July 2004) is a professional footballer who plays as a goalkeeper for Chelsea. Born in France, he is a youth international for Algeria.

Club career

Early life
Born in Saint-Maurice, Val-de-Marne, France to an Algerian father and Moroccan mother, Tlemcani played for Créteil-Lusitanos before joining Paris FC. He spent two years with Paris FC, training with the first team at only 15 years old.

Move to England
In October 2020, he joined English Premier League side Chelsea.

In February 2022, Tlemcani was loaned to Isthmian League side Merstham on a short-term deal. He went on to make five appearances in the league.

He extended his deal with Chelsea in August 2022, signing until 2025.

International career
Tlemcani is eligible to represent France through birth, and both Algeria and Morocco through his parents. He was called up to the French under-16 team in November 2019.

Ahead of the 2021 Africa U-17 Cup of Nations, which was cancelled due to the COVID-19 pandemic in host country Morocco, Tlemcani pledged his international future to Morocco, stating on his Instagram page that he had decided to represent them instead of Algeria. This choice was strengthened further when, in September 2021, he received a surprise call up to the Morocco senior set up ahead of 2022 World Cup qualification games.

Despite Tlemcani initially expressing his pride at representing Morocco, his father said in an interview in September 2022 that he had a desire to represent Algeria at international level, but had yet to hear from the Algerian Football Federation. He has since gone on to represent Morocco at under-20 level.

In February 2023, Tlemcani chose to represent Algeria.

Career statistics

Club

Notes

References

External links
 

2004 births
Living people
Algerian footballers
French footballers
Moroccan footballers
Morocco youth international footballers
Algerian people of Moroccan descent
Moroccan people of Algerian descent
French sportspeople of Moroccan descent
French sportspeople of Algerian descent
Association football goalkeepers
Isthmian League players
US Créteil-Lusitanos players
Paris FC players
Chelsea F.C. players
Merstham F.C. players
Moroccan expatriate footballers
French expatriate footballers
Algerian expatriate sportspeople in England
French expatriate sportspeople in England
Moroccan expatriate sportspeople in England
Expatriate footballers in England